Guns, Girls and Gangsters is a 1959 American film noir crime film directed by Edward L. Cahn starring Mamie Van Doren, Gerald Mohr, Lee Van Cleef, and Grant Richards.

Plot
Chuck Wheeler is released from prison and plans an elaborate heist of an armored truck carrying money from a Las Vegas casino. Chuck enlists the help of nightclub owner Joe Darren as well as Vi Victor, a sensational blonde married to Chuck's ex-cellmate Mike Bennett. Mike is a very jealous and dangerous man who will not grant Vi a divorce. He escapes from prison just before the armored truck robbery is to occur and causes havoc when he locates Chuck, Joe, and his unfaithful wife.

Cast
Mamie Van Doren as Vi Victor
Gerald Mohr as Chuck Wheeler
Lee Van Cleef as Mike Bennett
Grant Richards as Joe Darren
Elaine Edwards as Ann Thomas
John Baer as Steve Thomas
Paul Fix as Lou Largo

Production
Robert E. Kent produced the film for Edward Small. Filming commenced in April 1958.

See also
 List of American films of 1959

References

 (credits, film synopsis).

External links
 
 

1959 films
1959 crime drama films
American heist films
American crime drama films
1950s English-language films
Films directed by Edward L. Cahn
Films set in the Las Vegas Valley
United Artists films
Films produced by Edward Small
Film noir
1950s heist films
1950s American films